Frederick Schiller Faust (May 29, 1892 – May 12, 1944) was an American writer known primarily for his Western stories using the pseudonym Max Brand. He (as Max Brand) also created the popular fictional character of young medical intern Dr. James Kildare for a series of pulp fiction stories. His Kildare character was subsequently featured over several decades in other media, including a series of American theatrical movies by Paramount Pictures and Metro-Goldwyn-Mayer (MGM), a radio series, two television series, and comics. Faust's other pseudonyms include George Owen Baxter, Evan Evans, George Evans, Peter Dawson, David Manning, John Frederick, Peter Morland, George Challis, Peter Ward, Frederick Faust and Frederick Frost. As George Challis, Faust wrote the "Tizzo the Firebrand" series for Argosy magazine. The Tizzo saga was a series of historical swashbuckler stories, featuring the titular warrior, set in Renaissance Italy.

Death
During early 1944, when Faust, Frank Gruber, and fellow author Steve Fisher were working at Warner Brothers, they often had idle conversations during afternoons, along with a Colonel Nee, who was a technical advisor sent from Washington, D.C. One day, charged with whiskey, Faust talked of getting assigned to a company of foot soldiers so he could experience the war and later write a war novel. Colonel Nee said he could fix it for him and some weeks later he did, getting Faust an assignment for Harper's Magazine as a war correspondent in Italy.   While traveling with American soldiers fighting in Italy in 1944, Faust was wounded mortally by shrapnel.

Titles & series

Dan Barry series
 The Untamed (1919)
 The Night Horseman (1920)
 The Seventh Man (1921)
 Dan Barry's Daughter (1923)

Ronicky Doone Trilogy
 Ronicky Doone (1921)
 Ronicky Doone's Treasures (1922)
 Ronicky Doone's Rewards (1922)

Silvertip series
 Silvertip (1941)
 The Man from Mustang (1942)
 Silvertip's Strike (1942)
 Silvertip's Roundup (1943)
 Silvertip's Trap (1943)
 Silvertip's Chase (1944)
 Silvertip's Search (1945)
 The Stolen Stallion (1945)
 Valley Thieves (1946)
 Mountain Riders (1946)
 The Valley of Vanishing Men (1947)
 The False Rider (1947)

Dr. Kildare series
 Interns Can't Take Money (1936)
 Whiskey Sour (1938)
 Young Doctor Kildare (1938)
 Calling Dr. Kildare (1939)
 The Secret of Dr. Kildare (1939)
 Dr. Kildare's Girl and Dr. Kildare's Hardest Case (1940)
 Dr. Kildare Goes Home (1940)
 Dr. Kildare's Crisis (1941)
 The People vs. Dr. Kildare (1941)

Tizzo the Firebrand series
 The Firebrand (1934)
 The Great Betrayal (1935)
 The Storm (1935)
 The Cat and the Perfume (1935)
 Claws of the Tigress (1935)
 The Bait and the Trap (1935)
 The Pearls of Bonfadini (1935)

Other novels
 Above the Law (1918)
 Devil Ritter (1918)
 Harrigan! (1918)
 Riders of the Silences (1919)
 Trailin'! (1919)
 The Man Who Forgot Christmas (1920)
 The Ghost (The Ghost Rides Tonight!) (1920) [writing as Frederick Faust]
 Black Jack (1921)
 Bull Hunter (1921)
 Donnegan (Gunman's Reckoning) (1921)
 The Long, Long Trail (1921)
 Sheriff Larrabee's Prisoner (1921)
 A Shower of Silver (1921)
 Way of the Lawless (1921)
 Alcatraz (1922)
 Gun Gentlemen (1922)
 The Rangeland Avenger (1922)
 The Garden of Eden (1922)
 The Lost Valley (1922)
 Wild Freedom (1922)
 His Name His Fortune (1923) [writing as Frederick Faust]
 Outlaw Breed (1923)
 The Quest of Lee Garrison (1923)
 The Gold King Turns His Back (1923) [writing as John Frederick]
 Rodeo Ranch (1923)
 Rustlers of Beacon Creek (The Winged Horse)(1923)
 Soft Metal (1923)
 "Sunset" Wins (1923) [writing as George Owen Baxter]
 Timber Line (1923)
 Under His Shirt (1923)
 The Gambler (1924)
 The Tenderfoot (1924)
 The Smiling Desperado (1924)
 The Whispering Outlaw [a.k.a. The Whisperer of the Wilderness] (1924)
 In the River Bottom's Grip (1925)
 Jim Curry's Test (1925)
 The Black Rider (1925) [writing as George Owen Baxter]
 In The River Bottom's Grip (1925) writing as David Manning
 His Fight for Pardon (1925) [writing as George Owen Baxter]
 Acres of Unrest (1926)
 Fate's Honeymoon (1926)
 Fire-Brain (1926)
 Werewolf (1926)
 The Iron Trail (1926)
 The Outlaw Tamer (1926)
 The White Cheyenne (1926)
 Trouble Trail (1926)
 Pleasant Jim (1926)
 The Blue Jay (1926)
 Single Jack (1926, 1927)
 Sawdust and Sixguns (1927)
 The Mountain Fugitive (1927)
 The Mustang Herder (1927)
 The Pride of Tyson (1927)
 Thunder Moon Strikes (1927)
 Border Guns (1928)
 Hunted Riders (1928)
 Pillar Mountain (1928)
 The Gun Tamer (1928)
 The Sheriff Rides (Silver Trail) (1928)
 Tragedy Trail (1928)
 King of the Range (a.k.a. Strength of the Hills) (1929)
 Tiger Man (1929)
 The Seven of Diamonds (1929)
 Destry Rides Again (1930) (adapted to films of the same name in 1932 and 1939)
 Marbleface [a.k.a. Pokerface; The Tough Tenderfoot] (1930)
 Sixteen in Nome (1930)
 The Hair-Trigger Kid (1931)
 The Killers (1931)
 Lucky Larribee (1932)
 The Boy who Found Christmas (1932)
 The Lightning Warrior [a.k.a. The White Wolf] (1932)
 Trail Partners (1932)
 The Two-Handed Man (1932)
 Blood on the Trail (1933)
 Gunman's Gold (1933)
 Rider of the High Hill (1933)
 The King Bird Rides (Kingbird's Pursuit) (1933)
 The Red Bandanna (1933)
 The Stage to Yellow Creek (1933)
 The Whisperer: A Reata Story (1933) [writing as George Owen Baxter]
 Red Devil of the Range [a.k.a. The Red Pacer; Horseback Hellion; The Man From savage Creek] (1933)
 Crooked Horn (1934)
 Cheyenne Gold (1935)
 Montana Rides Again (1935)
 Six-Gun Country (1935)
 The Song of the Whip (1936)
 Happy Jack (1936)
 Singing Guns (1938)
 The Dude (1940)

See also

References

External links

 Max Brand official website
 Guide to the Frederick Schiller Faust Papers at The Bancroft Library
 
 
 
 
 

1944 deaths
1892 births
20th-century American novelists
20th-century American male writers
American Western (genre) novelists
Pulp fiction writers
Writers from Seattle
American war correspondents of World War II
American male novelists
American male short story writers
20th-century American short story writers
Novelists from Washington (state)
20th-century American non-fiction writers
American male non-fiction writers
American historical novelists
Writers of historical fiction set in the early modern period
American civilians killed in World War II
Journalists killed while covering World War II